Leila Maryam Ben Youssef (born November 13, 1981 in Sidney, Montana, United States) is a Tunisian-American pole vaulter. She is a multiple-time Tunisian record holder in the pole vault, and a gold medalist at the 2007 All-Africa Games in Algiers, Algeria. She also holds a dual citizenship, and chose to represent her father's birthplace Tunisia at numerous sporting events, including the Olympic games.

Athletic career
Born in Sidney, Montana to a Tunisian father and a French mother, Ben Youssef started out her athletic career in pole vault at the age of fourteen. She excelled at her sport and academics throughout her years at Sidney High School, where she became a three-time Class A state champion, and posted a personal record of 12 feet and 7.5 inches (3.84 metres). Coming out of high school in 2000, Ben Youssef attended Stanford University in Stanford, California on a full academic and sport scholarship. She majored in human biology, minored in archaeology, and competed for the University's track and field team as a member of Stanford Cardinal. After completing her undergraduate degree in 2004, Ben Youssef also earned a master's degree of medical anthropology from the University.

Since graduating from Stanford University in 2005, Ben Youssef continued to compete for pole vault this time, as a member of the Tunisian national track and field team. In 2007, she reached her breakthrough season by winning gold medals at the Pan Arab Games in Cairo, Egypt, and at the All-Africa Games in Algiers, Algeria, with a height of 3.80 and 3.85 metres, respectively. The following year, Ben Youssef improved her performance at the African Championships in Addis Ababa, Ethiopia, when she cleared 4.00 metres to clinch another career gold medal. She also set a national record, and vaulted a personal best of 4.30 metres at an athletics meet in Los Gatos, California, earning her a spot on the Tunisian team for the Olympics.

At the 2008 Summer Olympics in Beijing, Ben Youssef successfully cleared a height of 4.00 metres in the women's pole vault. Unfortunately, she fell short in her bid for the final, as she placed thirty-second overall in the qualifying rounds, tying her position with Finland's Vanessa Vandy.

Shortly after the Olympics, Ben Youssef announced her retirement from pole vault to pursue her studies at the University of Washington School of Medicine at Montana State University in Bozeman.

References

External links

Profile – Stanford Cardinal
NBC Olympics Profile

1981 births
Living people
Track and field athletes from Montana
Tunisian female pole vaulters
Olympic athletes of Tunisia
Athletes (track and field) at the 2008 Summer Olympics
Stanford Cardinal women's track and field athletes
Stanford University alumni
American people of Tunisian descent
Sportspeople of Tunisian descent
American people of French descent
African Games gold medalists for Tunisia
African Games medalists in athletics (track and field)
People from Sidney, Montana
Athletes (track and field) at the 2007 All-Africa Games